Martynas Purlys (born July 18, 1971 in Vilnius) is a former Lithuanian professional basketball player and manager. He played for point guard and shooting guard positions. From 2010 to 2017 he was the team manager of the Lithuanian powerhouse Lietuvos rytas Vilnius. Currently, he is the head of international basketball players agency Sports Development Group.

References 

1971 births
Living people
Lithuanian men's basketball players
Point guards
Shooting guards
Basketball players from Vilnius